Pierre Francois de Vos (born 29 June 1963) is a South African constitutional law scholar.

Early life
De Vos was born in Messina, Transvaal, (now Musina, Limpopo) and matriculated from Pietersburg High School in Pietersburg (now known as Polokwane). His sister, Anne-Marie, is a well-known advocate.

He obtained a BComm (Law), an LLB and an LLM (cum laude) from Stellenbosch University, an LLM from Columbia University and an LLD from the University of the Western Cape.

Career 
De Vos taught law at the University of the Western Cape from January 1993 to July 2009, when he was appointed the Claude Leon Foundation Chair in Constitutional Governance at the University of Cape Town. He was appointed Deputy Dean of the UCT Law Faculty in January 2011.

He has published articles on sexual orientation discrimination and same-sex marriage, the enforcement of social and economic rights, HIV/AIDS, the construction of race, racism and racial discrimination and other human rights issues.

Since September 2006, de Vos has written a blog, Constitutionally Speaking, which deals with South African social and political issues from a constitutional law perspective. He is also a contributor to Thought Leader, a news and opinion website owned by the South African newspaper Mail & Guardian. His blog posts are simultaneously published on the Daily Maverick website. He is a regular media commentator on political and legal events in South Africa and has appeared on SABC and e.tv programmes, various South African radio stations, and on the BBC World Service and CNN International.

He is the chairperson of the Board of the Aids Legal Network, a non-governmental human rights organisation, and also served as a board member of the Triangle Project, a non-profit LGBT advocacy organisation. He is also a member of the advisory council of the Council for the Advancement of the South African Constitution.

In February 2004, in the first case considered by the Equality Court set up in terms of the Constitution of South Africa, de Vos and his partner won a case against the owners of a gay bar in Cape Town after the owners admitted that they had discriminated against de Vos's partner because of his race. As part of a settlement, which was made an order of court, the bar was ordered to pay R10,000 to Siyazenzela, a non-profit organisation nominated by de Vos's partner.

Political views
In 2008 de Vos became embroiled in a spat with Helen Zille, the leader of the official opposition in South Africa, after Zille had criticised Judge Nathan Erasmus for chairing a Commission of Inquiry set up to investigate wrongdoing by her party. Zille had said that "some judges allow themselves to be abused and I am afraid Nathan Erasmus is one of them". Writing on Thought Leader, de Vos took issue with Helen Zille, saying her party, the Democratic Alliance, was being "hypocritical" in trying to shut down the commission and that her comment about Justice Erasmus was "politically stupid" and served to undermine the independence of the judiciary. The Western Cape High Court eventually declared the Commission unconstitutional, but said its judgment should not be read to "suggest that Erasmus J was in any way a party to" the nefarious conduct of the then Premier.

In June 2009, after a radio debate between de Vos and Paul Ngobeni, a supporter of Judge President of the Cape, John Hlophe, de Vos was accused of being a racist who hated Hlophe. "This guy will be joining a group of gangsters who make Hlophe their do-or-die issue. Whites want to entrench themselves in the last unelected branch of government – the judiciary," said Ngobeni. De Vos denied the charge.

In 2009, de Vos was critical of the government's attempt to evict residents of Joe Slovo Informal Settlement in Cape Town and rulings upholding their eviction by the Western Cape High Court and the Constitutional Court of South Africa. In 2010 he was similarly critical of the decision by the City of Cape Town to build open toilets for the residents of Makhaza, a township in Cape Town. He has published many articles in support of the social movement Abahlali baseMjondolo, including commentary on the legal aspects of their occupation of land in Macassar and the attack on the movement in Kennedy Road.

In August 2011, De Vos came out in support of a call by South African Archbishop Emeritus Desmond Tutu's for a once-off wealth tax imposed on those who benefited from apartheid. He stated that the tax would be "a small gesture towards reconciliation and redress". He criticised the FW de Klerk Foundation for rejecting the idea of a reparations tax, and for saying in a media statement that it would be unconstitutional to do so, writing on his blog: "Such measures are not 'reverse discrimination' or 'positive discrimination' but are rather 'integral to the reach of our equality protection'".

In November 2015, De Vos wrote several articles arguing in favour of a change to the language policy at the University of Stellenbosch to eradicate the indirect racial discrimination imposed by the use of Afrikaans at the university.

Other writing 
De Vos is also the author of a novel, Slegs Blankes / Whites Only, written in Afrikaans. It tells the story of a young white South African man coming to terms with his father's involvement in an apartheid-era police hit squad.

Publications

Fiction

Non-fiction

Recent academic articles

 

 Index page of Public Law Review linked.
 Full article including English abstract linked.

References

1963 births
Living people
People from Musina Local Municipality
White South African people
South African LGBT people
South African atheists
South African jurists
Academic staff of the University of the Western Cape
Academic staff of the University of Cape Town
Stellenbosch University alumni
University of the Western Cape alumni
Columbia Law School alumni
South African bloggers